Theodor Koch (13 May 1905 – 21 October 1976) was a German engineer and weapons manufacturer, born in Zuffenhausen, Germany. As a young man, Koch apprenticed as a precision mechanic. After completing his apprenticeship he attended an engineering school in Esslingen. In 1924 he started work for Mauser in Oberndorf as an engineer and stayed with them until 1931. After the fall of Germany to the Allied Forces at the end of World War II the Mauser factory was dismantled. Koch, Edmund Heckler and Alex Seidel saved what they could and used it to found Heckler & Koch.

References

German company founders
20th-century German businesspeople
1905 births
1976 deaths
 
Businesspeople from Stuttgart